Maddy Kent Dychtwald is an author, professional speaker, and a board member for non-profits focused on the topic of aging and the influence of older women on the global economy. Her books have discussed the economic improvement of women over time and how the increasing social and political power of women will impact fields such as financial services, healthcare, and consumer marketing.

Career

Authorship
Dychtwald published a book in 2003 titled Cycles: How We Will Live, Work, and Buy that discusses demographic shifts in the population as people live to older ages and are still involved in economic systems, with 50 year olds becoming a dominant part of the business environment. Joan Axelrod-Contrada in The Boston Globe referred to the book's subject matter as a "thought provoking, well-reasoned argument" and that Dychtwald successfully made her book "packed with anecdotes, making for a lively read". 

A second book was made by Dychtwald and her husband Ken as a children's book to teach children about changes that continue to happen to people as they get old and how it is not only children that have to deal with changes in their lives. A senior illustrator for Disney, Dave Zaboski, and his 7 year old daughter created the pictures for the book and it was published in 2008 under the title Gideon's Dream: A Tale of New Beginnings. Her third book titled Influence: How Women's Soaring Economic Power Will Transform Our World for the Better was published in 2010 and addressed how traditional roles for men and women have been changing, with women making up more than half of those employed and the majority of university degrees conferred annually.

News and media
Dychtwald has been featured in various media outlets including Newsweek, U.S. News & World Report, and TIME. She is a contributor to the Wall Street Journal’s Retirement Expert Panel, where she authored the top wealth-management expert post for 2017 and 2018 based on reader traffic.

Professional speaking and consulting
Dychtwald and her husband founded a consulting firm named Age Wave that specifically aims to give advice and information to those in the baby boomer generation on a variety of topics. She also frequently acts as a professional speaker in various international events, such as a trip to Melbourne, Australia in June of 2000 to speak on the subject of choice and how lifestyle trends are shifting so more people at various stages of their life can make new career decisions and even continue their education at an old age. She presented before the Greater Raleigh Chamber of Commerce in September of 2007 on how baby boomers are working to older ages and the impact that would have on the economy. Alongside Merrill Lynch's Women and Financial Wellness division, Dychtwald conducted a study on the amount of money on average men and women make and determined there was a significant wage gap because women retire early, with this often putting them in financial difficulties in their later years.

Awards and honors
Together with her husband Ken Dychtwald, she received the Esalen Prize in 2016 for outstanding contributions to advancing the human potential of aging men and women worldwide.

Personal life
A graduate of New York University, Dychtwald has been a working mother living in the San Francisco Bay Area for much of her adult life.

Books
 

 (republished August 2008, Free Press).

References

External links
 Wall Street Journal
 Huffington Post

Living people
American non-fiction writers
HuffPost writers and columnists
Year of birth missing (living people)